Santos is a surname of Christian origin in Portuguese and Spanish languages. The English translation of Santos is Saints. A singular version, Santo, may be seen.

The dos Santos (English: 'of the saints') variation in Portugal and Galicia was commonly given to a baby born or baptised around All Saints’ Day.

Near the close of the nineteenth century and at the end of the Brazilian Empire, the abolition of slavery in Brazil led to the rise in the name's usage within slave communities, Santos becoming a common surname in area of the Bay of All Saints. A Portuguese slave with no surname, for example, might take the name Santos upon the abolition of slavery and subsequently earning his freedom; this would indicate that he was of Bahian origin. The surname was also used as a way to shorten the names of Brazilians, for example: Manuel da Bahia de Todos os Santos (en: Manuel of the Bay of All Saints).

Other Iberian grammatical forms include: De Santo, De Santos, Del Santo, Santi, Santis, Santiz, Senti, Sentis and others. Notable individuals with the surname Santos include:

General

Ahmed Santos (newspaper columnist) (born 1974), Mexican newspaper columnist and former boxer
Alberto Santos-Dumont (1873–1932), Brazilian aviation pioneer
Alexandre Jose Maria dos Santos, a Mozambican Cardinal of the Roman Catholic Church.
Alfredo M. Santos (1905–1990), former Filipino AFP chief of staff
Domitila, Marchioness of Santos (1797–1867), Brazilian noblewoman and the mistress of Emperor Pedro I of Brazil
George Anthony Devolder Santos (1988- ) Member of the United States House of Representatives, 2023-present
Isabel dos Santos, daughter of President of Angola from 1979 to 2017 José Eduardo dos Santos; as of 2020, her wealth is $2 billion & the richest person in Africa
Lúcia dos Santos, known as Sister Lúcia of Jesus, Portuguese Roman Catholic Carmelite nun and seer of Our Lady of Fatima
Lúcio Alberto Pinheiro dos Santos (1889– 1950), Portuguese philosopher
José Abad Santos (1886–1942), 5th Justice of the Supreme Court of the Philippines
Paulino Santos, (1890–1945), Filipino soldier
Ricardo Santos (disambiguation)
Rufino Jiao Santos (1908–1973), Filipino Archbishop of Manila and cardinal
Santos Benavides (1823–1891), American soldier
Vicente Abad Santos (1916–1993), Justice of the Supreme Court of the Philippines

Arts
Santos (artist) (Sante Pucello, born 1971), Italian DJ 
Antony Santos (born 1967), Dominican Bachata singer/composer
Anthony "Romeo" Santos, Dominican-American songwriter, lead singer, and featured composer of Aventura
Artur Carlos Maurício Pestana dos Santos (born 1941), known as Pepetela, Angolan writer
Ary dos Santos (1937–1984), Portuguese poet
Cesar Santos (born 1982) Cuban-American artist and portrait painter
Charo Santos (born 1955), Filipino actress and president of ABS-CBN Network 
Daniel Santos (singer) (1916–1992), Puerto Rican singer and composer
Diana Santos (born 1950), Mexican voice actress
Domingo Santos (1941–2018), Spanish writer
Emanuele Rodriguez dos Santos (c. 1702–1764) Portuguese-Roman architect
Enrique Santos Discépolo (1901–1951), Argentinian musician
Erik Ramos Santos (born 1982), Filipino singer
Gervacio Santos, Filipino film editor
Henry Santos Jeter, Dominican singer and composer/vocals for Aventura
Jay Santos, Spanish dance singer
Jesse Santos (1928–2013), Filipino comics artist
Joe Santos (1931–2016), American actor
Joly Braga Santos (1924–1988), Portuguese composer and conductor
José dos Santos Ferreira (1919–1993), Portuguese-Macanese writer
José Manuel Cerqueira Afonso dos Santos (1929–1987), known as Zeca Afonso, Portuguese singer, composer and poet
Jovino Santos-Neto (born 1954), Brazilian musician
Judy Ann Santos (born 1978), Filipino actress
Lenny Santos, Dominican-American guitarist, producer/arranger for Aventura
Lucélia Santos (born 1957), Brazilian actress, director and producer
Matthew Santos (born 1982), American alternative music singer
Max Santos, Dominican-American bassist for Aventura
Mayra Santos-Febres (born 1966), Puerto-Rican writer
Nelson Pereira dos Santos (1928–2018), Brazilian movie director
Pablo Santos (1987–2006), Mexican actor
Patricia Santos Marcantonio, American fiction writer
Rhea Santos (born 1979), Filipino TV news host and journalist
Roberto Santos (1928–1987), Brazilian film director
Romeo Santos, American singer, songwriter, record producer and actor
Vilma Santos, Filipino actress

Politicians
Ahmed Santos (militant), Filipino convert to Islam and political militant
Antonio da Costa Santos (died 2001), Brazilian architect and politician
António dos Santos Ramalho Eanes (born 1935), Portuguese general and politician
Conrad Santos (1934–2016), Canadian politician
Délio dos Santos (died 2020), Brazilian politician
Eduardo Santos Montejo, owned the El Tiempo newspaper, and served as the President of Colombia from August 1938 to August 1942
Elvin Santos (born 1963), Honduras 2009 presidential candidate
Fernando da Piedade Dias dos Santos (born 1950), Angolan politician
Francis E. Santos, CHamoru (Guam) politician
Francisco R. Santos, CHamoru (Guam) politician
George Santos (born 1988), American politician
Hélio de Oliveira Santos (born 1950), Brazilian physician and politician
José Eduardo dos Santos (1942–2022), Angolan politician and former president of Angola
José Santos Guardiola (1816–1862), Honduran politician
José Santos Zelaya (1853–1919), Nicaraguan politician
Juan Manuel Santos Calderón, Colombian president
Manuel António dos Santos (born 1943), Portuguese politician
Marcelino dos Santos (1929–2020), Mozambican politician
Teresita Santos, politician from the Northern Mariana Islands

Sports
Adilson dos Santos (born 1976), Brazilian footballer 
Airton Ribeiro Santos (born 1990), Brazilian footballer 
Alessandro dos Santos, Brazilian-Japanese footballer
Alison dos Santos (born 2000), Brazilian runner
Álvaro Santos (born 1980), Brazilian footballer
André Bernardes Santos (born 1989), Portuguese midfielder footballer
André Santos (born 1983), Brazilian footballer
Andréia dos Santos, Brazilian footballer
Arwind Santos (born 1981), Filipino basketball player
Cairo Santos (born 1991), Brazilian american football placekicker
César Santos (born 1969), Brazilian footballer 
Cristiano Ronaldo dos Santos Aveiro, Portuguese footballer
Daiane dos Santos (born 1983), Brazilian gymnast
Daniel Santos (boxer) (born 1975), Puerto Rican boxer
Djalma Santos (1929–2013), Brazilian footballer
Edgardo Santos (born 1970), Puerto Rican professional boxer
Eriks Santos (born 1996), Brazilian footballer
Fausto dos Santos (1905–1939), Brazilian footballer
Fernando Castro Santos (born 1952), Spanish football manager
Fernando Santos (Brazilian footballer) (born 1980)
Fernando Santos (Portuguese footballer) (born 1954), now a football manager
Flavio Santos (born 1987), Mexican footballer
Francileudo Santos (born 1979), Brazilian-born Tunisian footballer
Georges Santos, French-born (born 1970), Cape Verdean footballer
Giovani dos Santos (born 1989), Mexican footballer
Gregory Santos (born 1999), Dominican baseball player
Héctor Santos (footballer) (1944–2019), Uruguayan footballer
Héctor Santos (athlete) (born 1998), Spanish long jumper
Iliarde Santos (born 1980), Brazilian mixed martial artist
Jonathan dos Santos (born 1990), Mexican footballer
Jorge Luis dos Santos (born 1972), Brazilian footballer
José Mário dos Santos Mourinho Félix, Portuguese football manager
Julio Santos (born 1976), Ecuadorian freestyle swimmer
Junior dos Santos (born 1984), Brazilian mixed martial artist
Kelly Santos (born 1979), Brazilian WNBA basketball player
Leslie George Santos, Hong Kong footballer
Luis Santos (baseball) (born 1991), Dominican baseball pitcher
Luís Santos (water polo) (born 1980), Brazilian water polo goalkeeper
Luíz Antônio dos Santos (born 1964), Brazilian long-distance runner
Luís Fernando Rodrigues dos Santos (born 1983), Brazilian footballer
Maicon Santos (born 1984), Brazilian footballer
Manny Santos (boxer) (1940–2013), Tongan/New Zealand boxer of the 1960s and '70s
Marc Dos Santos (born 1977), Canadian soccer manager
Marcílio Luís Evangelista dos Santos (born 1964), Brazilian footballer known as Santos
Marco Aurélio Cunha dos Santos (born 1967), Brazilian footballer
Maria Santos (swimmer) (born 1978), Portuguese swimmer
Marílson Gomes dos Santos (born 1977), Brazilian distance-runner
Neymar da Silva Santos, Jr. (born 1992), Brazilian footballer
Nicholas Santos (born 1980), Brazilian freestyle swimmer
Nílton Santos (1925–2013), Brazilian football player
Omir Santos (born 1981), Puerto Rican baseball player
Paulo Jorge dos Santos Futre (born 1966), Portuguese footballer
Renan dos Santos (born 1989), Brazilian footballer
Ricardo Izecson dos Santos Leite aka "Kaká" (born 1982), Brazilian footballer
Ricky Santos (born 1984), American Canadian football quarterback
Rodney Santos (born 1973), Filipino professional basketball player
Rodrigo dos Santos (born 1981), Brazilian water polo player
Ronivaldo Santos Conceição (born 1972), Brazilian squash player
Rony Santos (born 1995), Cape Verdean footballer
Sergio Santos (baseball) (born 1983), American baseball player
Sérgio Santos (volleyball) (born 1975), also known as Serginho or Escadinha, Brazilian volleyball player
Sergio Santos (footballer, born 1994), Brazilian footballer
Sérgio Santos (footballer, born 1998), Portuguese footballer
Sidnei dos Santos, Jr. (born 1982), Brazilian volleyball player better known as Sidão
Sueli dos Santos (born 1965), Brazilian javelin thrower
Tiago Alencar dos Santos (born 1986), Brazilian footballer
Todd Santos (born 1964), American footballer 
Toninho dos Santos (born 1965), Brazilian footballer
Victor Irving Santos (born 1976), Dominican-American baseball player
Yanelis Santos (born 1986), Cuban volleyball player

Others 
Johan Santos (born 1987), Filipino television actor
Keity Souza Santos, Brazilian immunologist
Lulu Santos (born 1953), Brazilian singer and guitarist
Riza Santos (born 1987), Filipino-Canadian beauty queen
Tony Santos, Spanish funk/R&B singer

Characters
Santos Family, in the American soap opera Guiding Light
Danny Santos
Michelle Bauer Santos, a fictional character on the popular CBS daytime soap opera, Guiding Light
Matt Santos, character on the United States television show The West Wing
Manny Santos (Degrassi: The Next Generation), character on the Canadian television show Degrassi: The Next Generation

All My Children 
Julia Santos
Mateo Santos
Maria Santos
Rosa Santos
Tageiry Santos
Diana Santos
Derrica Santos
Tiyanna Santos
Derrick 'Dee$' Santos
Charmaine Santos
Ta'Poris Santos

See also
Santos (disambiguation)

References

Portuguese-language surnames
Spanish-language surnames
Mozambican surnames
Angolan surnames
Surnames of Filipino origin